The Nashville Tennessee Temple is the 84th operating temple of the Church of Jesus Christ of Latter-day Saints.

The intent to build the Nashville Tennessee Temple was announced in 1994. The temple originally was to be built in the affluent suburb of Forest Hills, but the plan was turned down by city commissioners due to zoning rules.  It was eventually built next to an existing meetinghouse in Franklin using the church's small temple plan. The temple's exterior is constructed from Imperial Danby white marble and has a single spire topped with the familiar statue of the angel Moroni. The temple serves church members in central and eastern Tennessee and western Kentucky.

During the open house held May 6–13, 2000, almost 25,000 people toured the temple. James E. Faust, of the church's First Presidency, dedicated the Nashville Tennessee Temple on May 21, 2000.

See also

 Comparison of temples of The Church of Jesus Christ of Latter-day Saints
 List of temples of The Church of Jesus Christ of Latter-day Saints
 List of temples of The Church of Jesus Christ of Latter-day Saints by geographic region
 Temple architecture (Latter-day Saints)
 The Church of Jesus Christ of Latter-day Saints in Tennessee

Notes

References

External links
 Official Nashville Tennessee Temple page
 Nashville Tennessee Temple page

20th-century Latter Day Saint temples
Buildings and structures in Williamson County, Tennessee
Latter Day Saint movement in Tennessee
Religious buildings and structures in Tennessee
Temples (LDS Church) completed in 2000
Temples (LDS Church) in the United States
2000 establishments in Tennessee